Bloody Scotland is a Scottish international crime writing festival, held annually in Stirling, Scotland. It was founded in 2012 by Tartan Noir writers Lin Anderson and Alex Gray and describes itself as "the literary festival where you can let down your hair and enjoy a drink at the bar with your favourite crime writer".  Its sponsors include the University of Stirling and Stirling Council. In 2022 most events were held at the Albert Halls or the Tolbooth.

The festival awards The McIlvanney Prize for "the best Scottish Crime book of the year" (so named in 2016 for writer William McIlvanney (1936-2015), who has been called "the Godfather of Tartan Noir"), and, since 2019, the  Bloody Scotland Scottish Crime Debut of the Year.

McIlvanney Prize winners
 2012: Charles Cumming, A Foreign Country
 2013: Malcolm Mackay, How A Gunman Says Goodbye
 2014: Peter May, Entry Island
 2015: Craig Russell, The Ghosts of Altona
 2016: Chris Brookmyre, Black Widow
 2017: Denise Mina, The Long Drop
 2018: Liam McIlvanney (son of William McIlvanney),The Quaker  
 2019: Manda Scott, A Treachery of Spies (the winner chose to share the prize with the other shortlisted authors: Doug Johnstone, Denise Mina and Ambrose Parry) 
 2020: Francine Toon, Pine
 2021: Craig Russell, Hyde
 2022: Alan Parks, May God Forgive

Scottish Crime Debut of the Year winners
 2019: Claire Askew, All the Hidden Truths
 2020: Deborah Masson, Hold Your Tongue
 2021: Robbie Morrison, Edge of the Grave
 2022: Tariq Ashkanani, Welcome to Cooper

References

External links

Literary festivals in Scotland
Crime fiction
2012 establishments in Scotland